Trappe may refer to:

People
 James Trappe, an American mycologist
 Wade Trappe, American engineer

Places

 Trappe, Maryland, a town in Talbot County
 Trappe, Pennsylvania, a borough in Montgomery County